Carol Anne or Carol-Anne is a blended name combining Carol and Anne that is a Danish, English, Norwegian and Swedish feminine given name derived from the names Karl and Hannah. Notable people referred to by this name include the following:

Given name

Known as Carol Anne or Carol-Anne

Carol Anne Bond, petitioner in Carol Anne Bond, Petitioner v. United States
Carol Anne Davis (born 1961), Scottish crime novelist
Carol-Anne Day (born 1986), Canadian actress and musician
Carol Anne Haley (born 1972), Canadian politician
Carol Anne Letheren (1942 — 2001), Canadian executive
Carol Anne Meehan (born 1956), Canadian politician
Carol Anne O'Marie (1933 – 2009), American Roman Catholic sister and writer
Carol Anne Riddell, American reporter and journalist

Known as Carol

Carol Anne Evans, known as Carol Evans, (1938 – 2007), Welsh cricketer
Carol Anne Gotbaum, known as Carol Gotbaum (1960s – 2007), South African-born air traveler
Carol Anne Gotway Crawford, known as Carol A. Gotway Crawford, American mathematical statistician
Carol Anne Heimer, known as Carol Heimer (born 1951), American sociology professor
Carol Anne Hughes, known as Carol Hughes (author) (born 1961), British-born American novelist
Dame Carol Anne Kidu, known as Carol Kidu or Carol, Lady Kidu, DBE (born 1948), Australian-born Papua New Guinean politician
Carol Anne Martin, known as Carol Martin (born 1957), Australian politician
Carol Anne Morley, known as Carol Morley (born 1966), English film director, screenwriter and producer
Carol Anne Page, known as Carol Page (born 1948), British sport shooter
Carol Anne Philipps, known as Carol Philipps (1965 – 2009), Canadian journalist and activist
Carol Anne Franziska Antonia Pilars de Pilar, known as Carol Pilars de Pilar (born 1961), German artist
Carol Anne Tavris, known as Carol Tavris (born 1944), American social psychologist and feminist
Carol Anne Williams, known  as Carol Williams (organist) (born 1962), British-born composer

Fictional character
Carol Anne Freeling, main character in the Poltergeist franchise

See also

Carolanne D'Astous-Paquet
Carol Ann

Notes

Feminine given names
Danish feminine given names
English feminine given names
Norwegian feminine given names
Swedish feminine given names